The 2009–10 Israeli Premier League was the 11th season since its introduction in 1999 and the 68th season of top-tier football in Israel. It began on 22 August 2009 and ended on 15 May 2010 with the last matches of the playoff round.

On 15 May 2010, Hapoel Tel Aviv won the title in the last play-off round after Maccabi Haifa failed to win against Bnei Yehuda and they won their game against Beitar Jerusalem in a late goal at the 90+2' minute of extra time.

Changes from 2008–09 season

Structural changes
The league size has been increased from twelve to sixteen teams. Further, the competition has been split into two stages, a conventional season and playoffs.

The participating clubs were first play a conventional round-robin schedule for a total of 30 matches.

The top six teams were first had to play in the Top playoff. Points earned during the regular season were halved with an odd number of points being rounded up. The round was played on a round-robin schedule. The winner after this round would win the Israeli championship and would participate in the second qualifying round of the 2010–11 UEFA Champions League. The runners-up would play in the third qualifying round of the UEFA Europa League, and the third-placed team would play in the second qualifying round of the UEFA Europa League.

If the Israel State Cup winner finishes in the top three places than the fourth-placed would play in the first qualifying round of the UEFA Europa League.

In addition, clubs ranked seventh through tenth in the regular season would engage in a placement round, while the bottom six teams played out two relegation spots and one relegation play-off.

Team changes

Hapoel Ironi Kiryat Shmona were directly relegated to the 2009–10 Liga Leumit after finishing the 2008–09 season in last place.

Due to the increase in the number of teams, five teams were directly promoted from the 2008–09 Liga Leumit. These were champions Hapoel Haifa, runners-up Hapoel Acre, third-placed Hapoel Be'er Sheva, fourth-placed Hapoel Ramat Gan and fifth-placed Hapoel Ra'anana.

Hakoah Amidar Ramat Gan as 11th-placed team of the Premier League and Maccabi Ahi Nazareth as sixth-placed team of Liga Leumit competed in a two-legged playoff for another spot. Maccabi Ahi Nazareth won both matches by an aggregated score of 4–2 and were promoted to the Premier League. In turn, Hakoah Ramat Gan were relegated to Liga Leumit.

Overview

Stadia and locations

 The club played their home games at a neutral venue because their own ground did not meet Premier League requirements.

Managerial changes

Regular season

Table

Results

Playoffs
Key numbers for pairing determination (number marks position after 30 games):

Top Playoff
The points obtained during the regular season were halved (and rounded up) before the start of the playoff. Thus, Maccabi Haifa started with 39 points, Hapoel Tel Aviv with 36, Maccabi Tel Aviv with 26, Beitar Jerusalem with 23, Bnei Yehuda with 23 and F.C. Ashdod started with 22.

Table

Results

Middle Playoff
The points obtained during the regular season were halved (and rounded up) before the start of the playoff. Thus, Bnei Sakhnin started with 21 points, Hapoel Be'er Sheva with 20, Maccabi Netanya with 18 and Maccabi Petah Tikva started with 18.

Table

Results

Bottom Playoff
The points obtained during the regular season were halved (and rounded up) before the start of the playoff. Thus, Hapoel Ramat Gan started with 17 points, Hapoel Haifa with 16, Hapoel Petah Tikva with 16, Hapoel Acre with 13, Maccabi Ahi Nazareth with 12 and Hapoel Ra'anana started with 10.

Table

Results

Relegation playoff
The 14th-placed team Hapoel Ramat Gan faced the 3rd-placed Liga Leumit team Hapoel Kfar Saba. The winner Hapoel Ramat Gan earned a spot in the 2010–11 Israeli Premier League. The match took place on 22 May 2010.

Season statistics

Scoring
First goal of the season: Shahar Balilti for Hapoel Petah Tikva against Maccabi Ahi Nazareth, 61st minute (22 August 2009)
Fastest goal in a match: 17 seconds – Maor Buzaglo for Maccabi Tel Aviv against Beitar Jerusalem (17 April 2010)
Widest winning margin: 7 goals – Maccabi Ahi Nazareth 0–7 Hapoel Ramat Gan (15 May 2010)
Most goals in a match: 8 goals – 
Hapoel Tel Aviv 7–1 Hapoel Petah Tikva (21 November 2009)
Hapoel Tel Aviv 5–3 Hapoel Acre (27 March 2010)

Discipline
First yellow card of the season: Gal Cohen for Hapoel Petah Tikva against Maccabi Ahi Nazareth, 40th minute (22 August 2009)
First red card of the season: Ismail Abdul Razak for Hapoel Acre against Maccabi Haifa, 72nd minute (22 August 2009)

Top scorers

 The IFA also recognize Dimitar Makrievs goal in favour of F.C. Ashdod against Bnei Yehuda game which was later annulled because F.C. Ashdod fielded an ineligible player, for that F.C. Ashdod received a technical lose of 3–0, The original game was finished in a 1–1 draw.

See also
 2009–10 Israel State Cup
 2009–10 Toto Cup Al
 List of 2009–10 Israeli football summer transfers
 List of 2009–10 Israeli football winter transfers

References

 

Israeli Premier League seasons
Israel
1